Weekend Blockbusters is an Indian film production company based in Kollam, Kerala, India. It was established in 2014 by producer Sophia Paul. Its first production was the Malayalam film Bangalore Days (2014). In 2016, they produced two films - Kaadu Pookkunna Neram and Munthirivallikal Thalirkkumbol.

History 
Weekend Blockbusters debuted in film production in 2014 in Malayalam film industry by producing Bangalore Days, directed by Anjali Menon. The film jointly produced by Weekend Blockbusters and Anwar Rasheed Entertainments was a critical and commercial success. It collected an estimated sum close to ₹50 crore at the box office, and became one of the highest-grossing Malayalam films of all time. Their second production was Dr. Biju directed Kaadu Pookkunna Neram (2016) starring Indrajith Sukumaran.

The next film was the domestic drama Munthirivallikal Thalirkkumbol, Mohanlal starring film directed by Jibu Jacob. The film started production on 15 July 2016 in Kozhikode, Kerala. It was released in February 2017 and was a major commercial success with total gross over 50 crore worldwide. It was followed by the comedy road movie Padayottam starring Biju Menon.

Films

References 

Indian companies established in 2014
Film production companies of Kerala
Companies based in Kollam
2014 establishments in Kerala
Mass media companies established in 2014